The 1983 Scheldeprijs was the 70th edition of the Scheldeprijs cycle race and was held on 2 August 1983. The race was won by Jan Bogaert.

General classification

References

1983
1983 in road cycling
1983 in Belgian sport